Andhrimner was a literary and satirical weekly magazine, issued from January to September 1851 in Kristiania, Norway.

History and profile
Andhrimner was established in 1851, as Manden ("The Man"), but was later renamed after Andhrímnir of Norse mythology. Its editors were Aasmund Olavsson Vinje, Henrik Johan Ibsen and Paul Botten-Hansen. Some of Ibsen's early literary attempts were published in this magazine, under the pseudonym Brynjulf Bjarme, such as his poem Bjergmanden and the parody play Norma.

Even though it was a literary magazine first and foremost, it was also noted for its satire. It is regarded as Norway's second satirical magazine, after Krydseren.

References

1851 establishments in Norway
1851 disestablishments in Norway
Defunct literary magazines published in Europe
Defunct magazines published in Norway
Literary magazines published in Norway
Magazines established in 1851
Magazines disestablished in 1851
Magazines published in Oslo
Norwegian-language magazines
Satirical magazines published in Norway
Weekly magazines published in Norway